Indian Territory is a 1950 American Western film directed by John English and written by Norman S. Hall. The film stars Gene Autry, Gail Davis, Kirby Grant, James Griffith, Philip Van Zandt and G. Pat Collins. The film was released on September 30, 1950, by Columbia Pictures.

Plot

Cast
Gene Autry as Gene Autry
Gail Davis as Melody Colton
Kirby Grant as Lieutenant Randy Mason
James Griffith as The Apache Kid aka Johnny Corday
Philip Van Zandt as Curt Raidler
G. Pat Collins as Jim Colton 
Roy Gordon as Major Farrell
Pat Buttram as Shadrach Jones
Champion as Champ

References

External links
 

1950 films
American Western (genre) films
1950 Western (genre) films
Columbia Pictures films
Films directed by John English
American black-and-white films
1950s English-language films
1950s American films